Anthony Cianflone is an Australian politician who is a current member of the Victorian Legislative Assembly, representing the district of Pascoe Vale. He was elected to his seat in the 2022 state election. 

He is a member of the Labor Party.

Early life and education 
Anthony was born in Melbourne's inner west to parents who had migrated from Italy. He grew up in the suburb of Coburg.

Political career 
Anthony was preselected following previous MP Lizzie Blandthorn's decision to contest the Legislative Council.

Personal life 
According to Anthony's parliamentary register of interests, he is a landlord and owns a rental property in Canadian, Victoria.

He has a wife and children.

References

Year of birth missing (living people)
Living people
Australian people of Italian descent
Australian Labor Party members of the Parliament of Victoria
Members of the Victorian Legislative Assembly
21st-century Australian politicians